Nasser Meftah (Arabic:ناصر مفتاح) (born 7 October 1995) is a Qatari footballer.

External links

References

Qatari footballers
Association football midfielders
1995 births
Living people
Al-Wakrah SC players
Qatar Stars League players
Qatari Second Division players
Place of birth missing (living people)